Randy is a given name, usually masculine.

Randy may also refer to:

 Randy (album), a 1964 album by Randy Weston
 Randy (band), a Swedish punk rock band
 Iban Iyanga, Equatorial Guinean footballer better known as Randy
 Randy, an English slang adjective for being in a state of sexual arousal
 Randy, a song by Justice from the 2016 album Woman

See also
Randi (disambiguation)